United Arab Republic containing Egypt only participated at the 1963 Mediterranean Games held in Naples, Italy.

References

Mediterranean Games
Nations at the 1963 Mediterranean Games
Egypt at the Mediterranean Games